The flag of the Chuvash Republic (Çovaş Respublikin yalavö; , Flag Respubliki Chuvashia), in the Russian Federation, is one of the official symbols of the Chuvash Republic, alongside the coat of arms and the State Anthem of the Chuvash Republic. The flag is a 5:8 yellow flag with a stylized red tree of life charged on the flag. The flag has been used officially as the flag of the Chuvash Republic since 14 October 1992.

Prior to 1992, the Chuvash Republic existed as the Chuvash Autonomous Soviet Socialist Republic. Prior to 1937, Chuvash ASSR used a flag with traditional motifs of Chuvashia and the name of the ASSR. The motifs was deleted later in 1931 due to the traditional motifs being associated with chauvinism and bourgeois nationalism. After 1937, the flag of the Chuvash ASSR was identical to the flag of the Russian SFSR.

Symbolism 
The colors of the national flag, which consisted of gold and purple (sandal red) are the traditional colors of the Chuvash people. In Chuvash tradition, gold symbolized wealth, justice, mercy, magnanimity, constancy, strength, and loyalty, while purple is one of the most common colors among the Chuvash symbolism, which were used to carry out the main elements of the folk ornament. Purple symbolizes dignity, power, and courage.

The tree of life, which occupies  of the width of the flag, is a sign made on the basis of Old Chuvash runic writing, whose silhouette resembles a revered oak tree of Chuvash, powerful and durable, resistant to natural storms. The symmetry of the composition “The Tree of Life” expresses the desire of the Chuvash people for inner spiritual harmony and harmony with the outside world and nature. In addition, the Tree of Life, as a single organism, personifies the unity of the people living in the territory of the Chuvash Republic.

The tree of life consists of five elements, the main one being the center of the whole composition, the base has a bottom field and ends at the top with two branches of the Tree diverging at 90 degrees in the form of a national ornament. This element means the indigenous population of the Chuvash Republic - Chuvash, living in the territory of the republic.

The two lower elements, located symmetrically on both sides of the main element, have a base of purple bands separated from the lower purple field and the main element with a yellow strip 1.5% wide of the flag, and end with “branches” in the form of a national ornament. These elements symbolizes the Chuvash diaspora.

Two middle elements in the form of short inclined strips not adjacent to the main trunk of the Tree and also ending with a national ornament, located symmetrically on both sides of the main element at an angle of 45 degrees to it between the “branches” of the main and lower elements, which symbolizes the population of the different nationalities living in the Chuvash Republic.

The emblem “Three suns”, consisting of a three-fold repetitive ancient solar sign (an eight-pointed star), symbolizes the sunlight that gives life and protects well-being. Threefold repetition of the star that overshadows the main emblem of the flag - “The Tree of Life” means the Chuvash folk concept “Pulna, Pur, Pulatpar” (“Were, Is, We Will”) and is its graphic expression.

Gallery

History

Proposals

References

Citations

Bibliography

Constitutions

External links

Flag
Flags of the federal subjects of Russia
Chuvashia
Flags introduced in 1992